Albany Township is the name of some places in the U.S. state of Pennsylvania:
Albany Township, Berks County, Pennsylvania
Albany Township, Bradford County, Pennsylvania

Pennsylvania township disambiguation pages